Charlotte Escudero (born 26 December 2000) is a French rugby union player who plays for Blagnac SCR and the France women's national rugby union team.

Career
Escudero who joined Blagnac at the age of 18, had been called up to the French squad ahead of the 2022 Women's Six Nations Championship but had to pull out with injury, however she remained in the French coaches thoughts and was called up again on her return. She made her France debut in September 2022 against Italy. She was named in France's team for the delayed 2021 Rugby World Cup in New Zealand. She started the World Cup quarter-final against Italy that France won to clinch a semi final berth.

References

2000 births
Living people
French female rugby union players